Selonian may refer to:

Selonians, an extinct tribe of Balts
Selonian language, the language spoken by the Baltic Selonian people
Selonian (Star Wars), an alien race in Star Wars

See also
Selonia, a cultural region of Latvia

Language and nationality disambiguation pages